Franz Isser (born 17 August 1932) was an Austrian bobsledder who competed during the 1960s. Along with Pepi Isser, Heini Isser, and Fritz Isser, he won the bronze medal in the four-man event at the 1962 FIBT World Championships in Garmisch-Partenkirchen. He also competed in the two-man event at the 1964 Winter Olympics.

References

External links
Bobsleigh four-man world championship medalists since 1930
 

Austrian male bobsledders
Living people
1932 births
Olympic bobsledders of Austria
Bobsledders at the 1964 Winter Olympics